Linda Somers-Smith (born May 7, 1961 in Bitburg Air Force Base, Rhineland-Palatinate) is an American long-distance runner who is a two-time United States national champion in the marathon. Somers competed in the marathon at the 1996 Summer Olympics. She also won the 1992 Chicago Marathon (2:37:41) and the 1993 California International Marathon (2:34:11).  Somers is notable as she is one of the very few athletes who has continued running at the elite level since she turned Pro in 1984 into the transition to Masters athlete.  She continues to win and place in Open competition, even at the age of 50, all the while as a practicing attorney.

She has run in seven US Olympic Trials Marathons and in the 2008 Boston venue she set the United States 45-49 age group record (2:38:49)* placing 17th.  She continues to show impressive results, placing sixth in the Open US Club Nationals Cross Country meet in 2009* (Lexington, KY), and setting age group road records in the 5K (16:14, San Jose 11/26/2009)*, the 10k (33:39, Paso Robles, CA  9/26/2010), 10 Miles (57:07 Redding, CA 3/6/2010) and the Half Marathon (1:13:32, Rock 'n Roll San Jose Half Marathon, CA 10/3/2010).

Somers qualified for her seventh consecutive US Olympic Trials A Standard, a record number, while winning the Masters title (sixth place overall finish ) in the 2010 Los Angeles Marathon (2:36:33). On January 14, 2012, at the age of 50, she finished in 28th place at the USA Olympic Trials Marathon in Houston with a time of 2:37:36, another American Age Group Record.

Somers was inducted into the Road Runners Club of America (RRCA) Hall of Fame on March 17, 2012.  Later in 2012 she was inducted into the USATF Masters Hall of Fame.

US road running Records

Age 45+
5 km - 16:14 (November 2009)
10 miles - 57:09 (March 2010)
20 km - 69:42 (October 2010)
Half-marathon - 73:32 (October 2010)
30 km - 1:52:44 (April 2008)

Age 50+
World age 50+ Half-marathon record - 75:18 (October 2011)
Marathon - 2:37:36 (January 2012)
As of 2017

Achievements

References

External links

Profile at www.legacy.usatf.org

1961 births
Living people
People from Bitburg
American female long-distance runners
American female marathon runners
Athletes (track and field) at the 1996 Summer Olympics
Olympic track and field athletes of the United States
Chicago Marathon female winners
21st-century American women